YY1-associated protein 1 is a protein that in humans is encoded by the YY1AP1 gene.

The encoded gene product presumably interacts with YY1 protein; however, its exact function is not known. Alternative splicing results in multiple transcript variants encoding different isoforms.

References

Further reading